The  is a railway line in Tochigi Prefecture, Japan, owned and operated by East Japan Railway Company (JR East).

Services
Trains run approximately once every hour, traveling the entire length of the line. Some trains travel through onto the Utsunomiya Line (Tohoku Main Line) to Utsunomiya Station.

Stations

Rolling stock
 EV-E301 series BEMU (since 15 March 2014)

From the start of the revised timetable on 15 March 2014, a new EV-E301 series two-car battery electric multiple unit (BEMU) was introduced on the Karasuyama Line and Tohoku Main Line between Utsunomiya and Karasuyama. Developed from the experimental "Smart Denchi-kun" battery electric railcar also tested on this line since 2012, the EV-E301 series train is recharged at a special recharging facility built at Karasuyama Station, and operates on battery power over the non-electrified Karasuyama Line tracks.

All of the remaining KiHa 40 series diesel trains used on the line were withdrawn on 3 March 2017, and replaced with EV-E301 series battery electric units from the start of the revised timetable on 4 March 2017.

Former rolling stock
 KiHa 40 series DMUs (until 3 March 2017)

History
The line opened on 15 April 1923. With the privatization of Japanese National Railways (JNR) on 1 April 1987, the line came under the control of JR East.

Wanman driver only operation commenced on the line on 10 March 1990, using KiHa 40 series DMUs.

References

External links

 JR East Karasuyama Line information 

 
Rail transport in Tochigi Prefecture
Lines of East Japan Railway Company
1067 mm gauge railways in Japan
Railway lines opened in 1923
1923 establishments in Japan